Elizabeth Blanchard may refer to:

 Elizabeth Blanchard (actress) (1799–1849), British-born American stage actress
 Elizabeth Blanchard (educator) (1834–1891), American educator
 Elizabeth Blanchard (New Hampshire politician), American Democratic politician